The Memorial Van Damme is an annual athletics event at the King Baudouin Stadium in Brussels, Belgium, that takes place in late August or early September. Previously one of the IAAF Golden League events, it is now the final event of the Diamond League, along with Weltklasse Zürich.

It was first organized in 1977 by a group of journalists in honour of Ivo Van Damme, a Belgian double medal winner at the Montreal Olympics who was killed the previous year in a car accident at the age of 22.

World records
Over the course of its history, numerous world records have been set at Memorial Van Damme.

2004 
 10,000 m men Junior 27:04.00 Boniface Kiprop Toroitich, Uganda
 3,000 m steeplechase men 7:53.63 Saif Saaeed Shaheen, Qatar 
 Pole vault women 4.92 m Yelena Isinbayeva, Russia

2001 
 3,000 m men Junior 7:30.67 Kenenisa Bekele, Ethiopia
 3,000 m steeplechase men 7:55.28 Brahim Boulami, Morocco

1997 
 5,000 m men 12:39.74 Daniel Komen, Kenya
 10,000 m men 26:27.85 Paul Tergat, Kenya

1996 
 10,000 m men 26:38.08 Salah Hissou, Morocco
 1,000 m women 2:28.98 Svetlana Masterkova, Russia

1995 
 5,000 m men Junior 13:07.38 Daniel Komen, Kenya
 1,000 m women 2:29.34 Maria de Lurdes Mutola, Mozambique

1981 
 1 mile men 3:47.33 Sebastian Coe, United Kingdom

Meeting Records

Men

Women

References

External links

 Diamond League – Brussels Official Web Site

 
Diamond League
IAAF Golden League
Athletics competitions in Belgium
Sport in Brussels
Recurring sporting events established in 1977
Annual sporting events in Belgium
IAAF World Outdoor Meetings